Hugh Louis Lamb (October 6, 1890 – December 8, 1959) was an American prelate of the Roman Catholic Church. He served as the first bishop of the Diocese of Greensburg in Pennsylvania from 1951 until his death in 1959.  He previously served as an auxiliary bishop of the Archdiocese of Philadelphia in Pennsylvania from 1936 to 1951.

Biography

Early life 
Hugh Lamb was born on October 6, 1899 in Modena, Pennsylvania.  He graduated from Coatesville High School in 1907 and then enrolled in St. Charles Borromeo Seminary in Philadelphia. He also studied in Rome at the Pontifical North American College and Pontifical Urbaniana University, obtaining a doctorate in sacred theology in 1915.

Priesthood 
While in Rome, L:amb was ordained to the priesthood for the Archdiocese of Philadelphia by Cardinal Basilio Pompili on May 29, 1915 at the Lateran Basilica.

Lamb's early assignments included parishes in Philadelphia and Coatesville, Pennsylvania and he served a professor at St. Charles Seminary through 1921. From then until 1923, he was secretary to Cardinal Dennis Dougherty and superintendent of archdiocesan schools until 1926. Lamb was named a domestic prelate of his holiness in 1927 and served as chancellor of the archdiocese until 1936. 

Lamb once described then-U.S. Ambassador to Mexico Josephus Daniels as "a consummate jackass" who "easily succumbed to the flattery of Plutarco Calles, the power in Mexico, who is known as the God-hater ... [and] publicly expressed approval of the Socialistic and Communistic educational program." In 1929, Lamb became a protonotary apostolic.

Auxiliary Bishop of Philadelphia 
On December 15, 1935, Lamb was appointed as an auxiliary bishop of the Archdiocese of Philadelphia and titular bishop of Elo by Pope Pius XI. He received his episcopal consecration on March 19, 1936, from Cardinal Dougherty, with Bishops Gerald O'Hara and George L. Leech serving as co-consecrators. As an auxiliary bishop, Lamb also served as vicar general of the archdiocese until 1951.

Bishop of Greensburg 
On May 28, 1951, Pope Pius XII named him the first Bishop of the newly erected Diocese of Greensburg in Western Pennsylvania. However, due to the unexpected death of Cardinal Dougherty on May 31, Lamb remained in Philadelphia as apostolic administrator of the Archdiocese until John Francis O'Hara, C.S.C., was named as Dougherty's successor in November of that year. During his tenure, he brought a vision for schools, hospitals and institutions to care for the elderly. Under his direction, nearly $6.5 million was spent on construction or additions to existing facilities. Eight new schools, including Greensburg Central Catholic High School, were created and 10 new parishes were established.

Lamb was also instrumental in the founding of Jeannette District Memorial Hospital in Greensburg, donating over $300,000 for its construction and securing the Sisters of Charity of Seton Hill to staff it. 

Hugh Lamb died at Jeanette Hospital after suffering a heart attack on December 8, 1959 at age 69.

References

1890 births
1959 deaths
People from Chester County, Pennsylvania
Roman Catholic Archdiocese of Philadelphia
20th-century Roman Catholic bishops in the United States
Roman Catholic bishops of Greensburg
St. Charles Borromeo Seminary alumni
Pontifical Urban University alumni
Religious leaders from Pennsylvania